Ernest James Langley (7 February 1929 – 9 December 2007) was an English footballer noted for his pacey, rampaging runs from the left full-back position and his long throw-ins. He is remembered particularly fondly by supporters of Fulham for his long service with the club during which he helped them achieve promotion to the First Division during the 1958–59 season; by Queens Park Rangers fans for featuring in the side which won the Third Division title and sensationally beat First Division West Bromwich Albion in the League Cup Final in the 1966–67 season and by non-league side Guildford City where he remains one of their most successful former players. Langley also enjoyed a short spell as an England international, playing three games for his country in 1958.

Club career

Amateur
Langley started his football career as an amateur playing for a number of non-league sides in the London area whilst still a teenager. His ability was soon attracting attention and in 1946 Langley was given his dream move – First Division side Brentford signing him when he was still only 17. Langley's stay with the Bees did not last long however - his height of 5 feet 9 inches apparently counting against him with manager Harry Curtis - and the Londoner was soon looking for another club.

As with many youngsters his age, Langley was called upon to do national service and it was while he was still in the army that Langley joined Guildford City in 1948. After a season playing with the Southern League side as an amateur, during which they narrowly avoided relegation, Langley turned professional in 1949.

Guildford City
Langley was a huge crowd favourite at Guildford City, helping them to two Southern League cup finals in 1951 and 1952 during his four seasons there. After the near catastrophic 1948–49 season he also helped the Surrey side to record a top ten finish in each of the following three seasons. It was hence with great reluctance that Guildford were forced to sell their prized asset to Second Division Leeds United for £2,000 in the summer of 1952 after slipping some £12,000 into debt. He was not forgotten by the club however and in the mid 1970s when Guildford City merged with Dorking FC and were forced to sell their Joseph's Road ground for housing, a Langley Close was created on the site in his honour

Leeds United
Langley's second shot at making it in the Football League was as unhappy as his first as Langley made only 9 appearances for Leeds during his one season there. Despite scoring on his debut and on two subsequent occasions in his nine appearances on the left wing, manager Major Frank Buckley preferred to play Elland Road stalwart Grenville Hair at Langley's preferred position of left back and Langley moved to Third Division (South) Brighton & Hove Albion in the summer of 1953.

Brighton and Hove Albion
Albion finally provided Langley with the opportunity to show his ability and he thrived at the south coast club during his four seasons there, helping them secure runners up position in the 1953–54 and 1955–56 seasons and captaining them for two years. He was selected to play for the Third Division South representative side in 1954–55 and 1956–57. Langley clearly felt he needed to prove his ability at a higher level, however and he agreed to a £12,000 move to Second Division Fulham in 1957.

Fulham

This move to Craven Cottage was arguably the making of Langley as he slotted well into Doug Livingstone's stylish side alongside the legendary midfielder Johnny Haynes. During Langley's eight seasons at the club he helped the Cottagers to the FA Cup semi finals in 1957–58 where they lost to Manchester United; and then to promotion back to the first division the following season. In 1959–60 the Cottagers secured their highest league position in the top flight ever as they finished 10th – a record not beaten until Chris Coleman helped the Cottagers to a ninth position finish in 2003–04. 
There were many highlights in Langley's career at Fulham but particularly picked out by the press after his death were his goal in the 1962 FA Cup semi-final replay against Burnley, despite his side eventually losing to the Clarets; and his selection for a London XI which lost to Barcelona in the Inter City Fairs Cup final in 1958. Perhaps the ultimate accolade however came from Sir Stanley Matthews when he selected Langley to be his opposite number in his final league match.

Queens Park Rangers
Langley left Fulham in 1965, moving to Queens Park Rangers in a £5,000 deal. Despite being in his mid thirties, he helped Rangers to a third-place finish in the Third Division in 1965–66 and the following season, he featured in the side which won the Third Division and won the 1966–67 League Cup, pulling off one of the greatest comebacks in football. They had had an outstanding run in earlier rounds, beating Colchester United 5–0 in the first round and Leicester City (4-2) Carlisle (2–1) and Birmingham City (7–2 on aggregate) in the semi finals. In the final at Wembley Stadium, they met the holders, First Division side West Bromwich Albion and appeared to be heading for a comprehensive defeat after conceding two Clive Clark goals in the first half. Yet Rangers responded by scoring three goals in the last 17 minutes and winning 3–2, handing Langley the first, and only silverware of his career.

Return to non-league
After being released by QPR at the end of that season, Langley turned his attention to management, becoming player-boss of Hillingdon Borough of the Southern League. Yet again he tasted success, steering the club into the third round proper of the FA Cup, beating Luton Town in the second round. He almost triumphed at Wembley once again in 1970–71 when Hillingdon featured in the FA Trophy final but his side lost 3–2 to Telford United.

International career
Langley's career for his national team was short and sweet and he perhaps should have had more time to prove himself. Then manager Walter Winterbottom selected Langley for the home international against Scotland in April 1958 after his impressive first season with Fulham and he helped the side to a 4–0 victory and he played in the 2–1 victory over Portugal at Wembley, though he did miss a penalty in that game. However a 5–0 defeat by Yugoslavia in the next game meant that he was never called up again after an international career of barely three weeks.

Post-playing career
Langley retired in 1971 and became a coach at Crystal Palace before returning to Hillingdon Borough as a club administrator. He appears to have had one last sojourn in management for Dulwich Hamlet in the latter part of the 1976–77 season where he strived, ultimately fruitlessly, to prevent their relegation into the Second Division of the Isthmian League.

Langley after his time at Hillingdon Borough Football Club was finally finished moved into a career in hospitality as managing steward with overall responsibility for the operation of the club including the bar and premises firstly at West Drayton Royal British Legion and then at Sipson Royal British Legion. He was a popular person well known for his slightly wide legged gait caused by a lifetime of strenuous physical activity playing football and his characteristic friendly charm that he displayed to everybody that he met.

Langley died in London at the age of 78. Six days after his death his former club Fulham held a minute's silence before their home match with Newcastle United.

References 

1929 births
2007 deaths
Footballers from Kilburn, London
English footballers
England international footballers
Association football defenders
Hillingdon Borough F.C. players
Hounslow F.C. players
Uxbridge F.C. players
Hayes F.C. players
Brentford F.C. players
Guildford City F.C. players
Leeds United F.C. players
Brighton & Hove Albion F.C. players
Fulham F.C. players
Queens Park Rangers F.C. players
English Football League players
English Football League representative players
London XI players
English football managers
Dulwich Hamlet F.C. managers